Servant of God Candido Amantini (January 31, 1914 – September 22, 1992), was an Italian Roman Catholic Passionist priest, Rev Fr Candido of the Immaculate, C.P., a Master Exorcist, spiritual director and confessor.

For 36  years as Fr Amantini, he was Rome's chief exorcist. Stationed at the Church of the Holy Staircase, he often saw 60 to 80 people per day. He also taught Sacred Scripture and Moral Theology. He wrote a book entitled Il Mistero di Maria, about the Virgin Mary.

Personal life 
Candido Amantini was born Eraldo Ulisse Mauro Amantini in Bagnolo di Santa Fiora, Province of Grosseto, Tuscany, the second of four children born to Giovanni Battista Amantini and Diolinda Fratini Amantini.  He was baptized 8 days after his birth, on February 7, 1914. He was confirmed on September 8, 1920 by Bishop Joseph Angelucci, Bishop of Città della Pieve.

At age 12, he entered the Passionist Minor Seminary in Rome (Nettuno) on October 26, 1926. At the age of 15, on October 9, 1929, he entered the Passionist Novitiate at the Retreat of St Joseph on Mount Argentario. On  October 23, he received the religious habit and was given the name Candido of the Immaculate. On October 24, 1930, he took temporary vows as a Passionist. He was transferred to Tavernuzze, near Florence, where he completed Lyceum in 1936. Then he went to Vinchiana – Ponte a Moriano (Lucca), to complete his studies in philosophy and theology.

On January 31, 1936, Amantini took his perpetual vows as a Passionist. Also in 1936, he was transferred to the Church of the Holy Staircase (La Scala Santa) in Rome, to study for his licentiate in theology at the Pontifical University of St. Thomas Aquinas, Angelicum.

After a long illness, Amantini died at night on the Feast of Saint Candido, his patron. He was buried in Rome at the Verano Cemetery. The Roman Catholic Church has named him a Servant of God. His remains were transferred to the Church of the Holy Staircase on March 21, 2012, and his cause for beatification is under investigation by the Congregation for the Causes of Saints.

Ministry 
He was ordained a priest at age 24 in Rome on March 13, 1937.

Amantini obtained a licentiate in Sacred Scripture at the Pontifical Biblical Institute in Rome in 1941. He had a capacity for languages and learned Greek, Hebrew, German and Sanskrit. From 1941 to 1945, he taught Hebrew and Sacred Scripture in Vinchiano (Lucca) and Vetralla (Viterbo). From 1945 to 1947 he returned to Rome, to instruct seminarians. He taught international students of the Passionist Order from 1947-1960, at the monastery of St John and Paul in Rome.

Amantini studied exorcism with Fr. Alessandro Coletti, C.P., exorcist of the Diocese of Arezzo and performed his first exorcisms under his guidance. Amantini also had contact with St Padre Pio of Pietrelcina. Padre Pio said of him: "Father Candido is a priest according to God's heart." From 1961 until his death in 1992, Amantini practiced exorcism full-time at the Church of the Holy Staircase in Rome.

References

 Amantini, C. (1987). Il mistero di Maria (The Mystery of Mary). Frigento (AV) (2 ed.) 
 Anonymous (2012). Servo di Dio Candido Amantini dell’Immacolata -Eraldo Amantini- Sacerdote Passionista (Servant of God Candido Amantini – Eraldo Amantini- Passionist Priest). http://www.santiebeati.it/dettaglio/95422
 Amorth, G. (2000).  An Exorcist: More Stories, ' Ignatius Press. 
 Amorth, G. (2002) L'esorcista della Scala Santa: Padre Candido Amantini (The Exorcist of the Church of the Holy Staircase: Fr. Candido Amantini). Il Crocifisso, Roma. 
 Pagliaro, M.C. (2009). Il Pastore delle valli oscure. L’esorcista, P. Candido Amantini.  (The Shepherd of Dark Valleys: The Exorcist Fr. Candido Amantini). La Stella del Mare, Nettuno.

1914 births
1992 deaths
People from Santa Fiora
Catholic exorcists
Passionists
Italian Servants of God
Pontifical Biblical Institute alumni
20th-century Italian Roman Catholic priests
Italian exorcists
Pontifical University of Saint Thomas Aquinas alumni